Earthquation is an album by the American jazz saxophonist David S. Ware, recorded in 1994 and released on the Japanese DIW label.

Music
As in previous DIW sessions, the quartet plays two standards, Eddie Heywood's "Canadian Sunset", which Ware first heard when he was young on Prestige record Boss Tenor by the saxophonist Gene Ammons, and two different versions of Walter Gross' "Tenderly". "Cococana" is dedicated to the Dutch filmmaker Coco Schrijber, who made the documentary about Ware In Motion.

Reception

In his review for AllMusic, Don Snowden wrote: "Earthquation is almost certainly a lesser work in the David S. Ware discography." By contrast, The Penguin Guide to Jazz thought that the album "is the more visceral to date, and the first that really begins to push the envelope; Coltrane, Ayler and Sanders suddenly do seem like a generation back." The Gramophone wrote that "the swarming intensity, the restless momentum ... sound here like so much huffing and puffing; strenuous bravura standing in for loss of direction." Option wrote that Ware "is not out of control; he's just able to sustain solos for several minutes without a lot of melodic information."

Track listing
All compositions by David S. Ware except as indicated
 "Canadian Sunset" (Eddie Heywood / Norman Gimbel) - 7:32 
 "Inverse Alchemy" - 8:55 
 "Tenderly"  (Walter Gross / Jack Lawrence) - 5:35
 "Ideational Blue" - 8:26
 "Cococana" - 11:32
 "Tenderly"  (Walter Gross / Jack Lawrence) - 4:45 
 "Earthquation" - 9:20

Personnel
David S. Ware - tenor saxophone
Matthew Shipp - piano
William Parker - double bass
Whit Dickey - drums

References

1994 albums
David S. Ware albums
DIW Records albums